The Army of the Kingdom of Serbia, known in English as the Royal Serbian Army, was the army of the Kingdom of Serbia that existed between 1882 and 1918, succeeding the Armed Forces of the Principality of Serbia and preceding the Royal Yugoslav Army.

Organization

Field armies
 First Army (Serbia)
 Second Army (Serbia)
 Third Army (Serbia)
 Timok Army
 Užice Army

Orders of battle
 Order of battle of the Serbian Army in the First Balkan War
 Order of battle of the Serbian Army in World War I

Wars

Military equipment

Armament

Uniform
Šajkača

See also

 First Serbian Volunteer Division
 Serbian Chetnik Organization
 Serbian Army

References

Sources

Books

Journals
Mijalkovski, Milan. "Četničke (gerilske) jedinice Kraljevine Srbije–borci protiv terora turskog okupatora." Zbornik radova Instituta za savremenu istoriju 09 (2007): 59–81.
Becić, Ivan M. "Ratni dugovi Kraljevine Srbije u svetlu politike." Istorija 20. veka 3 (2010): 45–56.
Gavrilović, Dejan V. Fizičko vežbanje i vojska Kraljevine Srbije. Diss. Univerzitet u Beogradu-Fakultet sporta i fizičkog vaspitanja, 2016.
Đorđević, Branislav D. "Training of the Serbian Army." Vojno delo 51.5-6 (1999): 149–165.
Denda, Dalibor. "Српска војска у предвечерје епохе ратова 1912–1920." Zbornik radova Instituta za savremenu istoriju 12 (2014): 423–436.
Đukić, Slobodan. "Contribution of the Military Academy to the development of military theory in Serbia in the second half of the 19th century and the first decade of the 20th century." Vojno delo 67.5 (2015): 401–425.
Mladenović, Božica. "Vojska Kraljevine Srbije za vreme Balkanskih ratova u ogledalu nemačke štampe." Baština 22 (2007): 161–171.
Barović, Vladimir. "Voluntary participation in the armed forces of the Kingdom of Serbia as a possible model of professionalization of the armed forces of the Republic of Serbia." Vojno delo 62.2 (2010): 348–360.
Ivetić, Vladimir. Politička uloga ministara vojnih Kraljevine Srbije od 1903. do 1914. godine. Diss. University of Belgrade, Faculty of Political Sciences, 2013.

Symposia

 
History of the Serbian Army